The 2006 European Marathon Cup was the 8th edition of the European Marathon Cup of athletics and were held in Gothenburg, Sweden, inside of the 2006 European Championships.

Results

See also
2006 European Athletics Championships – Men's Marathon
2006 European Athletics Championships – Women's Marathon

References

External links
 EAA web site

European Marathon Cup
European
International athletics competitions hosted by Sweden
2006 in Swedish sport
Marathon